M85 or M-85 may refer to:

Military
 M85 machine gun, a machine-gun used in the M60 Patton series of tanks
 Zastava M85, an assault rifle developed and manufactured by Zastava Arms
 Parker-Hale M85 a sniper rifle.

Places
 Messier 85, a lenticular galaxy in the constellation Coma Berenices
 85 Io, the asteroid #85, named "Io", a main belt asteroid

Highways
 M-85 (Michigan highway), a state highway in Michigan
 M85 expressway (Hungary)
 Mexican Federal Highway 85, a highway in Mexico
 Mexican Federal Highway 85D, a toll highway in Mexico

Transportation
 Morin M85, a French homebuilt aircraft design
 M85 fuel, an 85% methanol and 15% petrol blend

Other uses
 M 85, an age group for Masters athletics (athletes aged 35+)

See also

 
 
 85 (disambiguation)
 Model 1885 (disambiguation)